Eşme can refer to:

 Eşme
 Eşme, Silvan
 Eşme, Sungurlu